The Anstey River is a  river in the Interior region of British Columbia, Canada. It flows roughly north to south from the Monashee range of the Columbia Mountains, and drains into Anstey Arm on Shuswap Lake. The river was named for Francis Senior Anstey, who operated one of the first major logging operations in the area. The lower river and its delta are protected within Anstey Hunakwa Provincial Park.

References

External links 
 Map of the Anstey watershed, Shuswap Watershed Project

Rivers of British Columbia
Kamloops Division Yale Land District